The Foggy Hogtown Boys is a Canadian bluegrass band, based in Toronto, Ontario.

The band recorded their first CD live at the Lula Lounge in Toronto in 2004. Since then they have recorded several more critically acclaimed CDs. Their album "Pigtown Fling" was nominated for two awards at the 3rd Canadian Folk Music Awards, and were nominated again at the 4th and 6th Awards.

In 2005, when the band was playing  weekly at the Dominion Tavern in Toronto, they were considered to be the best traditional bluegrass band in the city.

In 2006 the band toured western Canada, performing at Millennium Place in Whistler, BC and at the Kootenay Bluegrass Society.

In 2007 the Foggy Hogtown Boys played a double bill with the American band the Grascals at the Silver Dollar tavern in Toronto. That year they also performed at a concert organized by the Pineridge Bluegrass Folklore Society in Oshawa, Ontario, and at the Calgary Folk Music Festival in Alberta.

In 2011 the band took part in the Hudson Music Festival in Quebec.

Members of the Foggy Hogtown Boys include John Showman on fiddle and Andrew Collins on Mandolin, Chris Coole on guitar, Chris Quinn on banjo. Bass was played until 2007 by John McNaughton, and after that by Max Heineman. Showman, Collins and Quinn also play in Creaking Tree String Quartet, a less traditional group, and Showman also plays in New Country Rehab.

References

Canadian bluegrass music groups
Musical groups from Toronto
Musical groups established in 2004
2004 establishments in Ontario